Udmurtia may refer to:
Udmurt Republic, a federal subject of Russia
Udmurt Autonomous Oblast (1920–1934), an administrative division of the Russian SFSR, Soviet Union
Udmurt Autonomous Soviet Socialist Republic (1934–1990), an administrative division of the Russian SFSR, Soviet Union